Gavin Liddle (born 9 May 1963) is an English former footballer who made 33 appearances in the Football League playing as a full back for Darlington in the 1980s. He also played non-league football for clubs including Spennymoor United, Bishop Auckland, Harrogate Town, Birtley Town, Washington Nissan, and Red House WMC. He went into coaching and management at a local level, as player-manager of Birtley Town, manager of Harrogate Town, coach and then for four years manager of Washington Nissan, with whom he won two Wearside League titles, and manager of Prudhoe.

References

1963 births
Living people
People from Houghton-le-Spring
Footballers from Tyne and Wear
English footballers
Association football defenders
Hartlepool United F.C. players
Darlington F.C. players
Spennymoor United F.C. players
Bishop Auckland F.C. players
Harrogate Town A.F.C. players
Sunderland Nissan F.C. players
English Football League players
Northern Football League players
Northern Premier League players
English football managers
Harrogate Town A.F.C. managers
Birtley Town F.C. players